This is a list of premiers of South Australia by time in office. The basis of the list is the inclusive number of years and days between dates.

Rank by time in office
Parties

Total time in office of political parties in South Australia
South Australian Parliament –  days as of

Current parties
Australian Labor Party – {{#expr:
 + 1 + 
 + 1 + 
 + 1 + 
 + 1 + 
 + 1 + 
 + 1 + 
 + 1 + 
 + 1 + 
 + 1 + 
 + 1 + 
 + 1 + 
 + 1 + 
 + 1 + 
 + 1 + 
 + 1 + 
      
Liberal Party of Australia – {{#expr:
 + 1 +  
 + 1 + 
 + 1 + 
 + 1 + 
     
}} days.

Other parties
Conservative or Liberal (Pre 1975): 17415 days.
Liberal and Country League – {{#expr:
 + 1 +  
 + 1 + 
        
}} days.
Liberal Federation – {{#expr:
 + 1 + 
        
}} days.
Liberal Union – {{#expr:
 + 1 + 
       
}} days.
Liberal and Democratic Union –  days.

Before political parties
 Independent –  days
 Non-Party Conservatism – {{#expr:
 + 1 + 
 + 1 + 
 + 1   
 }} days.
 Non-Party Liberalism – {{#expr:
 + 1 + 
 + 1 + 
 + 1   
 }} days.

Notes

See also
Premier of South Australia
List of prime ministers of Australia by time in office
List of Australian heads of government by time in office
List of premiers of New South Wales by time in office
List of premiers of Queensland by time in office
List of premiers of Tasmania by time in office
List of premiers of Victoria by time in office
List of premiers of Western Australia by time in office
List of chief ministers of the Northern Territory by time in office
List of chief ministers of the Australian Capital Territory by time in office

South Australia, Premiers of
Premiers
South Australia, Premiers